Ed Edmondson may refer to:

Ed Edmondson (chess official) (1920–1982), President of the United States Chess Federation
Ed Edmondson (politician) (1919–1990), American politician from Oklahoma